Fredrikshald Bay (variant, Fredrikshalds Bay) is an Arctic waterway in Kitikmeot Region, Nunavut, Canada. It is located in western M'Clintock Channel off the eastern coast of Victoria Island.

References

Bays of Kitikmeot Region
Victoria Island (Canada)